Knoblauch  is a surname of German origin, a metonymic occupational name for a gardener or trader with garlic. It is also the German word for garlic. It may refer to:
Chuck Knoblauch (born 1968), American baseball player
Ray Knoblauch (1928–2002), American baseball player and manager, and father of Chuck Knoblauch
Eddie Knoblauch (1918–1991), American baseball player, and uncle of Chuck Knoblauch
Charles E. Knoblauch (1922–1984), American politician
Eduard Knoblauch (1801–1865), German architect
Emil Friedrich Knoblauch (1864–1936), German botanist
Johannes Knoblauch (1855–1915), German mathematician
Karl-Hermann Knoblauch (1820–1895), German physicist
 Oskar Knoblauch (1925– present) Holocaust survivor and activist
Mary Bookstaver (1875–1950) (married name Knoblauch), American feminist

See also
Knobloch

Occupational surnames
German-language surnames